The Morrisville–Trenton Railroad Bridge is a rail bridge across the Delaware River between Morrisville, Pennsylvania and Trenton, Mercer County, New Jersey, United States.

The bridge carries the Amtrak Northeast Corridor trains and SEPTA Trenton Line as well as non-revenue trains for NJ Transit's Northeast Corridor Line that have terminated at the Trenton Transit Center bound for the Morrisville Yard.

History
A series of Pennsylvania Railroad (PRR) predecessors operated trains across the nearby Lower Trenton Bridge from 1834 until 1903, when PRR completed a grade separation project through Trenton, including this stone arch bridge on a new alignment.

In 1953, the Morrisville approach to the bridge was blocked when eight cars of an eighty-three-car freight train operated by the Pennsylvania Railroad derailed at 11 p.m. on January 13. No one was injured in the incident; however, four of the derailed cars were described in news reports as "smashed across the four tracks," along with a steel pole that "was knocked across the tracks, tearing down the lines feeding current to express and local trains." As a result, the railroad's main line to New York was inoperable for five hours, forcing the cancellation or delay of more than twenty passenger trains.

See also
List of bridges documented by the Historic American Engineering Record in New Jersey
List of bridges documented by the Historic American Engineering Record in Pennsylvania
List of bridges on the National Register of Historic Places in New Jersey
List of crossings of the Delaware River
National Register of Historic Places listings in Mercer County, New Jersey

References

Further reading

External links

"An Icy Delaware River" (photo of the Morrisville–Trenton Railroad Bridge). Bloomsburg, Pennsylvania: Press Enterprise, January 31, 2014, p. A3 (subscription required).

Amtrak bridges
Bridges completed in 1903
Bridges in Bucks County, Pennsylvania
Bridges in Mercer County, New Jersey
Railroad bridges on the National Register of Historic Places in New Jersey
Railroad bridges on the National Register of Historic Places in Pennsylvania
Bridges over the Delaware River
Buildings and structures in Trenton, New Jersey
Historic American Engineering Record in New Jersey
Historic American Engineering Record in Pennsylvania
National Register of Historic Places in Trenton, New Jersey
Pennsylvania Railroad bridges
Railroad bridges in New Jersey
NJ Transit bridges
Viaducts in the United States
Stone arch bridges in the United States
1903 establishments in New Jersey
1903 establishments in Pennsylvania
Interstate railroad bridges in the United States
SEPTA Regional Rail